Tom Rothrock is an American musician, composer, record producer and owner of Bong Load Records.  Tom Rothrock has worked with James Blunt, Foo Fighters, Moby, Beck, Badly Drawn Boy, R. L. Burnside, Athlete, Sloan, Gwen Stefani, Motörhead, Elbow, Stevie Nicks, Poison, Elliott Smith, Richard Thompson, Yonder Mountain String Band.  Rothrock has also composed or contributed to soundtracks for notable motion pictures such as About A Boy, Good Will Hunting, Collateral and The SpongeBob SquarePants Movie.

Rothrock started Bong Load Custom Records in the early 1990s enlisting former Record Plant Recording Studios co-workers, Bradshaw Lambert and Rob Schnapf.  Bong Load Records is notable for developing and releasing Beck's "Loser" single which became the first number one, non-major label single since FM radio became mainstream. Together Rothrock, Schnapf, Beck, and Karl Stephenson recorded Mellow Gold, Beck's major label debut.

In film, Rothrock produced the original songs for the About A Boy soundtrack and score with Badly Drawn Boy. He composed music for the film Collateral directed by Michael Mann and is credited on the song "Goofy Goober Rock" on The SpongeBob SquarePants Movie soundtrack. His recording of R. L. Burnside's "It's Bad You Know" was included on The Sopranos original television soundtrack release.

During 2013, Rothrock returned to collaborate with James Blunt on the album Moon Landing.  Working primarily at Sunset Sound Studios in Hollywood, California the resulting release was generally well received among music critics and considered a comeback for Blunt.

In 2016, Rothrock marked Bong Load Records' 25th anniversary by re-launching the label's vinyl record division.  He also relocated the Los Angeles company to the arts district of Las Vegas, Nevada.

Selected discography

Solo
 2014: Brightest Starr Single – Tom Rothrock Featuring Marie´ Digby
 2010: All Right Now Ep – Tom Rothrock
 2010: FuzzFace Ep – Tom Rothrock
 2010: Magneto Ep – Tom Rothrock
 2010: Eivissa Ep – Tom Rothrock
 2007: Resonator Lp – Tom Rothrock

Produced and/or mixed
 2013: Moon Landing – James Blunt
 2013: Division Street – Harper Simon
 2011: Blue Sky Blue – Pete Murray
 2009: Harper Simon – Harper Simon
 2009: Black Swan – Athlete
 2009: The Show – Yonder Mountain String Band
 2008: Unfold – Marie Digby
 2007: All the Lost Souls – James Blunt
 2007: New Moon – Elliott Smith
 2007: Never Slow Down – Roman Carter
 2006: Yonder Mountain String Band – Yonder Mountain String Band
 2005: Leaders Of The Free World – Elbow
 2005: Surgery – The Warlocks
 2005: Exploration – Sarah Lee Guthrie & Johnny Irion
 2005: Back to Bedlam – James Blunt
 2004: Launchpad – Particle
 2004: Greatest Hits: 30 Years Of Rock Who Do you Love Remix – George Thorogood
 2003: Action Pact – Sloan
 2003: Third Shift Grotto Slack – Jay Farrar
 2002: Have You Fed the Fish? – Badly Drawn Boy
 2002: About A Boy – Badly Drawn Boy
 2001: Hell Below/Stars Above – Toadies
 2000: Supreme Beings Of Leisure – Supreme Beings Of Leisure
 2000: Figure 8 – Elliott Smith
 1999: Mock Tudor – Richard Thompson
 1998: XO – Elliott Smith
 1998: Aquamosh – Plastilina Mosh
 1998: Come On In – R. L. Burnside
 1997: Either/Or – Elliott Smith
 1997: Soundtrack – Good Will Hunting
 1997: Mr. Wizard – R. L. Burnside
 1996: Mic City Sons – Heatmiser
 1996: Static Prevails – Jimmy Eat World
 1996: Odelay – Beck
 1995: Foo Fighters (album) – Foo Fighters
 1995: Daredevil – Fu Manchu
 1994: Rubberneck – Toadies
 1994: Mellow Gold – Beck
 1994: Box Set – Wool
 1993: Fishy Pants – Muzza Chunka
 1993: Test Your Own Eyes – Dog Society
 1992: Budspawn – Wool
 1991: Swallow This Live – Poison
 1991: Timespace – The Best of Stevie Nicks – Stevie Nicks

Selected film composition, film music production and placement
 2012: Holy Motors
 2004: Collateral
 2004: The SpongeBob SquarePants Movie
 2004: Shrek 2
 2002: About A Boy
 1999: The Sopranos
 1997: Good Will Hunting

References

External links
 Facebook page
 10 Years of Mellow Gold Documentary (retrospective documentary done for anniversary of the Beck's first album, features interviews with Rothrock)

American film score composers
American male film score composers
American rock guitarists
American rock pianists
American record producers
American audio engineers
Living people
Year of birth missing (living people)